Praça de Espanha station is part of the Blue Line of the Lisbon Metro.

History
It is one of the 11 stations that belong to the original Lisbon Metro network, opened on December 29, 1959, as Palhavã. This station is located in Praça de Espanha, hence its renaming.

The architectural design of the original station is by Francisco Keil do Amaral. On October 15, 1980, the station was extended, based on the architectural design of Sanchez Jorge.

Connections

Urban buses

Carris 
 716 Alameda D. A. Henriques ⇄ Benfica - Al. Padre Álvaro Proença
 726 Sapadores ⇄ Pontinha Centro
 746 Marquês de Pombal ⇄ Estação Damaia
 756 Olaias ⇄ Rua da Junqueira

Aerobus 
 Linha 2 Aeroporto ⇄ Sete Rios

Suburban buses

Transportes Sul do Tejo 
 151 Charneca de Caparica (Solmar) ⇄ Lisboa (Marquês de Pombal)
 152 Almada ⇄ Lisboa (Praça de Espanha) (via Alcântara)
 153 Costa de Caparica ⇄ Lisboa (Praça de Espanha) (via Alcântara)
 158 Lisboa (Praça de Espanha) ⇄ Trafaria (via Alcântara)
 159 Lisboa (Praça de Espanha) ⇄ Marisol (via Alcântara)
 160 Almada ⇄ Lisboa (Praça do Areeiro) (via Alcântara)
 161 Costa da Caparica ⇄ Lisboa (Praça do Areeiro) (via Alcântara)
 162 Lisboa (Praça de Espanha) ⇄ Quinta do Brasileiro
 168 Lisboa (Praça de Espanha) ⇄ Torre da Marinha/Depósito de Água (via Amora)
 176 Almada (Praça S. J. Batista) ⇄ Lisboa (Cidade Universitária) (via Alcântara)
 207 Lisboa (Praça de Espanha) ⇄ Sesimbra (via AE)
 252 Lisboa (Praça de Espanha) ⇄ Quinta do Conde (via Redondos)
 260 Lisboa (Praça de Espanha) ⇄ Sesimbra (via Laranjeiro)
 561 Lisboa ⇄ Setúbal (via Ponte 25 de Abril) (Rápida)
 563 Lisboa ⇄ Setúbal (via Ponte Vasco da Gama e Pinhal Novo) (Rápida)
 754 Lisboa ⇄ Setúbal (via AE e Casal do Marco)
 755 Lisboa (Praça de Espanha) ⇄ Setúbal (via Laranjeiro)

See also
 List of Lisbon metro stations

References

External links

Blue Line (Lisbon Metro) stations
Railway stations opened in 1959